The 1908–09 season was Stoke's first season in the Birmingham & District League.

With Stoke now out of the Football League they entered the Birmingham & District League for the 1908–09 season. With a new board, chairman, manager and squad Stoke used the season as a rebuilding one and the crowds began to return to the Victoria Ground. Stoke finished in eight place with 31 Points.

Season review

League
Stoke now playing in the Birmingham & District League, which included the reserve teams of Aston Villa, Birmingham, West Brom and Wolves plus some other useful opposition. With Alfred Barker now the manager the team itself was made up of an mixture of ex-professionals and amateurs. Of those which remained with the club were William Davies, Ernest Mullineux, Fred Rathbone and Sam Baddeley. Barker used 32 players during the season and eighth place was secured in the final league table.

Crowds were often good and there were turnouts of 7,000+ for a few league matches which confirmed that the club still had its local support. Wins of 7–0 over Wellington Town 5–0 over Walsall and 5–3 over Villa's second string were among the best performances while the nadir was an 8–1 defeat to West Brom reserves. Stoke's goalkeeper against Albion was Harry Cotton who after the match was sacked by Barker.

FA Cup
Stoke made a poor exit in the first round being well beaten 5–0 at Sheffield Wednesday.

Final league table

Results

Stoke's score comes first

Legend

Birmingham & District League

FA Cup

Squad statistics

References

Stoke City F.C. seasons
Stoke